The 1792 United States presidential election in Vermont took place between November 2 and December 5, 1792 as part of the 1792 United States presidential election. The state legislature chose four members of the Electoral College, each of whom, under the provisions of the Constitution prior to the passage of the Twelfth Amendment, cast two votes for President.

Vermont participated in its first ever presidential election, having become the 14th state on March 4, 1791. The state cast three electoral votes for incumbent George Washington and three for the incumbent vice president John Adams; one elector did not cast his votes.

See also
 United States presidential elections in Vermont

References

Vermont
1792
1792 Vermont elections